= Shripad Hegde =

Indian Classical Singer and musician

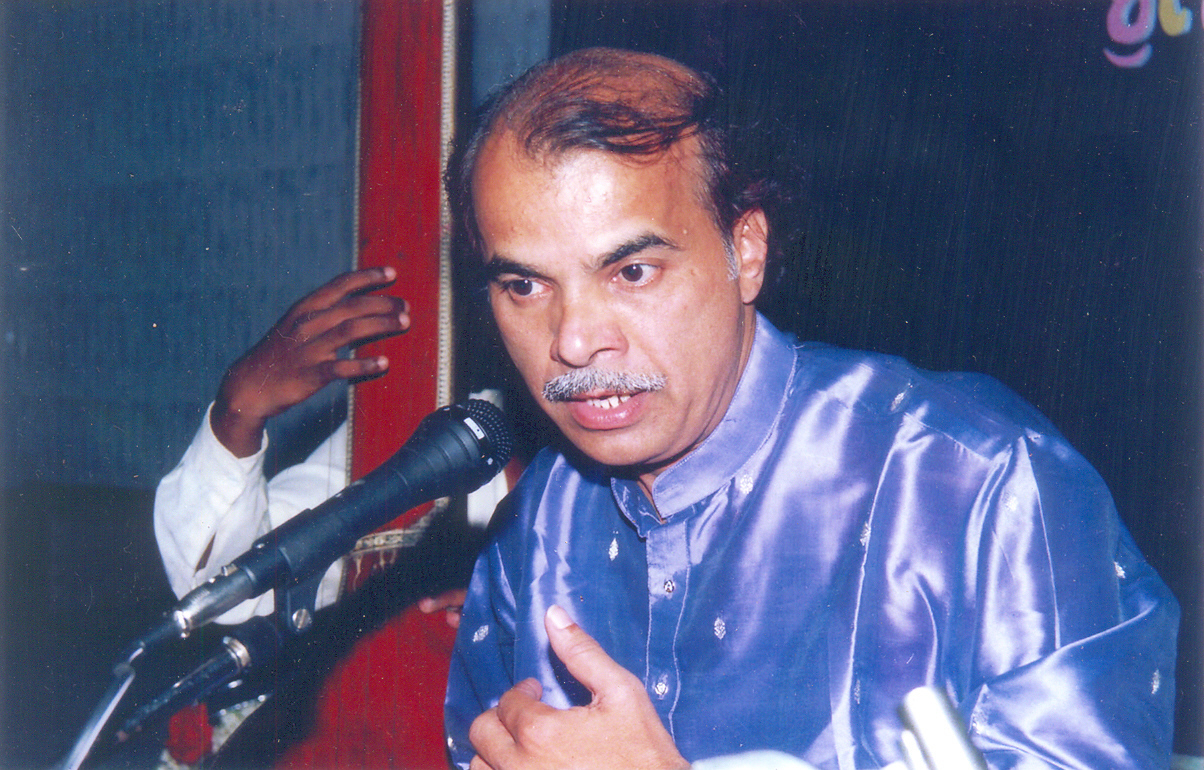
- Hegde performing in Bangalore, Karnataka, India.

Background information
- Genre: Indian classical music
- Occupations: Composer, vocalist

Pandit Shripad Hegde (Kannada: ಶ್ರೀಪಾದ ಹೆಗಡೆ) is an Indian music composer and Hindustani classical vocalist (born 1 January 1957) from Kampli, Uttara Kannada District. He has been on the staff of All India Radio, Dharwad, since 1987.

He received first place at AIR national level for the composition of "Megha medini", a sangeeta rupaka, and first place at state level for the composition of "Garudamruta".
